Hojjatabad-e Olya (also Romanized as Ḩojjatābād-e ‘Olyā; also known as Ḩojjatābād) is a village in Rostaq Rural District, in the Central District of Saduq County, Yazd Province, Iran. At the 2006 census, its population was 17, in 5 families.

References 

Populated places in Saduq County